Ganei Yohanan is a moshav in central Israel. Located in the Shephelah near Rehovot, it falls under the jurisdiction of Gezer Regional Council.

History
The moshav was founded in 1950 by immigrants from Romania on the lands of the Palestinian village of Aqir, and was named after Yohanan Kreminitsky. The founders were later joined by immigrants from Tripoli in Libya.

References

Libyan-Jewish culture in Israel
Moshavim
Populated places established in 1950
Populated places in Central District (Israel)
Romanian-Jewish culture in Israel
1950 establishments in Israel